Vanessa Ifediora is an Irish actor, photographer, and poet. She is known for her roles in Belfast and Derry Girls.

Early life
Ifediora was born in Belfast. She is of Irish and Nigerian heritage. Ifediora lived in Japan for a several years and speaks conversational Japanese. She suffers from depression and maladaptive daydreaming, which she treated effectively with the medication escitalopram. She also took up photography to help with her recovery and is now a freelance photographer. Ifediora has spoken about the racism she experienced growing up in Belfast and later when living in Cork. She moved to Dublin in 2017, which she described as "a different world" where she encountered less racism. She now lives in Belfast.

Career
Ifediora studied acting at the Irish Film Academy in Dublin. In 2020, Ifediora featured on the single Sowing Acorns by Emma Langford.

Filmography

References

Living people
Actors from Belfast
Photographers from Northern Ireland
21st-century poets from Northern Ireland
African diaspora in the United Kingdom
Year of birth missing (living people)